Jalen R. Adams (born December 11, 1995) is an American professional basketball player for Maccabi Tel Aviv of the Israeli Basketball Premier League and the EuroLeague. He played college basketball for the UConn Huskies.

College career
Adams arrived at Connecticut with high expectations, as a top-30 recruit from Roxbury, Massachusetts. Adams sunk a three-quarter court shot to help UConn defeat Cincinnati in four overtimes in the 2016 AAC Tournament. As a sophomore, Adams averaged 14.4 points and 6.1 assists per game on a team that finished 16–17.

Adams posted 18.1 points, 4.2 rebounds and 4.7 assists per game as a junior. As a senior, Adams averaged 16.9 points, 4.0 rebounds and 3.4 assists per game. His season was cut short due to an MCL sprain on his right knee suffered in an 81–63 loss to Temple in February 2019.

Adams is 12th all time on the UConn top scorers' list in 118 games played with 1,657 points scored in his collegiate career.

Professional career

Erie BayHawks (2019–2020)
After going undrafted in the 2019 NBA draft, Adams joined the New Orleans Pelicans for the NBA Summer League. He was also signed to an Exhibit 10 contract with the Pelicans. On October 19, 2019, Adams was waived by the New Orleans Pelicans. On October 26, 2019, Adams was included in the training camp roster of the Erie BayHawks. On January 14, 2020, he posted 33 points,  five assists, three rebounds and two steals in a 138–126 loss to the Maine Red Claws. Adams averaged 19 points and 4 rebounds per game.

Champagne Châlons-Reims Basket (2020–2021)
On June 10, 2020, Adams signed with Champagne Châlons-Reims Basket of the French LNB Pro A.

Erie BayHawks (2021)
On January 12, 2021, Adams was named to the opening night roster of the Erie BayHawks.

Hapoel Jerusalem (2021–2022)
On August 22, 2021, he signed with Hapoel Jerusalem of the Israeli Basketball Premier League.

Maccabi Tel Aviv (2022–Present)
On October 15, 2022, one day after Maccabi lost 86-71 to  Fenerbahce Beko Adams joined  Maccabi Playtika, his former team's, Hapoel Jerusalem's rival.

References

External links
UConn Huskies bio

1995 births
Living people
American men's basketball players
Basketball players from Boston
Brewster Academy alumni
Erie BayHawks (2019–2021) players
Hapoel Jerusalem B.C. players
Maccabi Tel Aviv B.C. players
Point guards
UConn Huskies men's basketball players